"Wanna Be the Man" is a single by the band Earth, Wind & Fire featuring MC Hammer, issued in 1990 on Columbia Records. The single peaked at No. 41 on the Cashbox Top R&B Singles chart and No. 46 on the Billboard Hot R&B Singles chart.

Critical reception
John Milward of Rolling Stone said the song is "sweetened by a buoyant vocal-group hook". Mitchell May of the Chicago Tribune wrote "Hammer's clipped delivery meshes so well with EWF's leaner sound that they might want to consider hiring him full-time". Bruce Britt of the Los Angeles Daily News wrote "'Wanna Be The Man' is great feel-good funk complete with a rapid fire rap by M.C. Hammer". J.D. Considine of the Baltimore Sun exclaimed "Take a tune like 'Wanna Be the Man' with its bouncy chorus, tight falsetto harmonies and intoxicating swirl of percussion, it has all the earmarks of an EW&F classic. Yet by toughening up the beat and tossing in a little rapping (by M.C. Hammer, no less), it seems as vital as anything on the charts. Now, how's that for understanding your heritage?". Pablo Guzman of the New York Daily News said "The pairing with M.C. Hammer on Wanna Be The Man" is "a kicking one". James T. Jones IV of USA Today found that "EWF smartly gets help from MC Hammer on the hard-edged Wanna Be the Man".

References

1990 singles
Columbia Records singles
Earth, Wind & Fire songs
1990 songs
Songs written by MC Hammer
Songs written by Maurice White
Songs written by Verdine White
Song recordings produced by Maurice White